Morne Plat Pays is a volcano on the island of Dominica. Located on the southern region of the island, the volcano last erupted around the year 1270 AD. Since the mid-18th century, a number of earthquake swarms have occurred near the mountain, but these are not related to Morne Plat Pays' eruptive activity.

See also 
 List of mountains of Dominica
 List of volcanoes in Dominica

References

External links
 

Mountains of Dominica
Volcanoes of Dominica
Mountains of the Caribbean
Inactive volcanoes